Naser Kiadeh may refer to:
 Bala Mahalleh-ye Naser Kiadeh
 Naser Kiadeh-ye Mian Mahalleh
 Pain Mahalleh-ye Naser Kiadeh